Broussard's, along with Galatoire's, Antoine's, and Arnaud's, is one of the four classic Creole New Orleans restaurants known as the Grand Dames.

Broussard's first opened in 1920, when an eminent local chef, Joseph Broussard, married Rosalie Borrello, and the couple moved into the Borrello family mansion (built in 1834) at 819 Conti Street in the French Quarter, where the restaurant now sits. Until their deaths, one month apart from each other in 1966, the Broussards resided in the apartment above the restaurant.

The restaurant was purchased from the Broussard family and underwent a major renovation in the early 1970s. It was owned and operated by Joseph Marcello and Joseph Segreto from 1975-1984, and Chef Gunter Preuss and family from 1984-2013. Broussards underwent another major renovation in 2013 when it was purchased from the Preuss family by Creole Cuisine Restaurant Concepts.

While the Napoleon (main) dining room was built in 1920, the adjoining dining rooms were constructed in 1831 and originally used as stables and slave quarters for the Hermann-Grima House, which now operates as a museum.

See also
 List of Louisiana Creole restaurants

External links
Broussards.com Official Site
Hermann-Grima House

Restaurants in New Orleans
French Quarter
French restaurants in the United States
Restaurants established in 1920
Louisiana Creole restaurants in the United States